The Black Horse Pike is a designation used for a number of different roadways that had been part of a historic route connecting the Camden area to the area of Atlantic City, New Jersey. Roadways now bearing the Black Horse Pike designation include portions of Route 168, Route 42, U.S. Route 322 (US 322), and US 40.

Route description

Route 168

The Black Horse Pike heads south from US 130 in Camden as a four-lane, divided highway comprising Route 168, which continues north of US 130 on Mt. Ephraim Avenue. It heads south and interchanges Route 76C, which heads west and provides access to Interstate 76 (I-76) and the Walt Whitman Bridge.  It passes through Haddon Township with many jughandles at intersections. It then passes through Mt. Ephraim, where the road was restriped in the late 1990s reducing it from four lanes to two, and enters Bellmawr, where it interchanges with exit 28 of I-295 and exit 3 of the New Jersey Turnpike (NJTP). It then enters Runnemede, where it crosses Route 41 and County Route 544 (CR 544). It then heads into Gloucester Township and interchanges with Route 42. It continues south, passing through Blackwood, where it intersects CR 534, and then widens back into a four-lane, divided highway. It then heads toward the southern terminus of the North–South Freeway (Route 42) and the western terminus of the Atlantic City Expressway, where Route 168 ends and the Black Horse Pike becomes Route 42.

Route 42

The Black Horse Pike heads south into Washington Township, Gloucester County on Route 42 as a four-lane divided highway lined with many businesses. In Cross Keys, it intersects CR 555. It then enters Monroe Township, where in Williamstown, it meets US 322 and CR 536 Spur. Here, Route 42 ends and US 322 heads east onto the Black Horse Pike.

US 322

US 322 heads southeast on the Black Horse Pike from Williamstown, intersecting CR 536 and CR 538. It heads into Folsom, Atlantic County, where it meets Route 54 at a cloverleaf interchange and then the southern terminus of Route 73. It continues into Hamilton Township, passing through rural areas. It intersects CR 559 shortly after crossing into Hamilton Township. Near Mays Landing, it features an interchange with Route 50. It continues southeast and near the Hamilton Mall and the former Atlantic City Race Course, it intersects US 40.

US 40/US 322 concurrency

US 40 joins US 322 and the two routes continue to the southeast along the Black Horse Pike.  Shortly after joining, the road intersects CR 575, which then forms a concurrency on the Black Horse Pike along with US 40 and US 322. It heads into Egg Harbor Township, and Route 575 splits from the Black Horse Pike by heading south on English Creek Avenue. The Black Horse Pike has an intersection with CR 563, which was formerly a traffic circle built in 1932 until it was replaced by traffic signals and jughandles in 2002. The Black Horse Pike has a brief concurrency with CR 563 and then meets the Garden State Parkway (GSP) with access provided by way of CR 563 and CR 608. The route continues east into Pleasantville, where it crosses US 9. It then passes through the center of Pleasantville on Verona Avenue, with the name changing back to Black Horse Pike. At the border with Atlantic City, the road becomes Albany Avenue, which carries US 40 and US 322 into Atlantic City.

History

The origins of the Black Horse Pike can be traced to 1795 when surveyors working for old Gloucester County, laid out a new and straight road to replace the meandering Irish Road. The new roadway carried various names including the Newton Road, Chews Landing-Philadelphia Road, Mount Ephraim-Blackwoodtown Road, etc. State legislators incorporated the Williamstown and Good Intent Turnpike Company in 1852, and Camden and Blackwoodtown Turnpike Company in 1855, converting the road into a toll road north of Good Intent.  

In 1923, the portion from Mays Landing to Atlantic City became part of Route 18S. With the 1927 New Jersey state highway renumbering, the route became Route 42 from Camden to Mays Landing and Route 48 from Mays Landing to Atlantic City. US 322 was later designated along the road from Williamstown to Atlantic City and US 40 from Mays Landing to Atlantic City. With the 1953 New Jersey state highway renumbering, which eliminated long concurrencies between U.S. and state routes in New Jersey, the Route 42 and Route 48 designations were removed from the parts of the road that were already signed as US 322 or US 40/US 322, with Route 42 cut back to Williamstown and Route 48 completely removed from the Black Horse Pike. Following the completion of the North–South Freeway, Route 42 was moved off the Black Horse Pike to the new freeway between Camden and Turnersville, and the Route 168 designation was given to the Black Horse Pike between Camden and Turnersville.

Major intersections
The mileposts correspond to the routes the Black Horse Pike follows.

See also

White Horse Pike

References

Roads in New Jersey
U.S. Route 40
U.S. Route 322
Former toll roads in New Jersey
Transportation in Atlantic County, New Jersey
Transportation in Camden County, New Jersey
Transportation in Gloucester County, New Jersey
Transportation in the Pine Barrens (New Jersey)